Buck Henry Sanders (Mississippi, 1971) is an American composer.

Raised in South Carolina, Buck Sanders moved to Los Angeles in 1989 to pursue his career as a musician. Met Marco Beltrami became his assistant in 1997, collaborating in the creation of numerous soundtracks, including that of The Hurt Locker for which they received an Oscar nomination for the best soundtrack in 2010.

References 
 The Hurt Locker : (Marco Beltrami and Buck Sanders)
 Interview with Marco Beltrami and Buck Sanders

External links 
 
 

1971 births
Living people
American film score composers
American male film score composers
La-La Land Records artists